Frederick Cawley, 1st Baron Cawley PC, JP (9 October 1850 – 30 March 1937), known as Sir Frederick Cawley, Bt, between 1906 and 1918, was a British businessman and Liberal Party politician. A wealthy cotton merchant, he represented Prestwich in parliament between 1895 and 1918 and served as Chancellor of the Duchy of Lancaster between 1916 and 1918. Created a baronet in 1906, he was ennobled as Baron Cawley in 1918.

Background and education
Cawley was born at Priestlands, Bunbury, Cheshire, the son of Thomas Cawley (1806–1875) by Harriet Bird, daughter of Samuel Bird, of Beeston Hall, Cheshire. He was educated at Aldersey School, Bunbury, and at Wesley College, Sheffield.

Political career

Cawley was involved in the Lancashire cotton industry, which made him a wealthy man. At the 1895 general election he was elected as Member of Parliament for Prestwich, a seat he held until 1918. In 1916 he was admitted to the Privy Council and appointed Chancellor of the Duchy of Lancaster in the war-time coalition of David Lloyd George, a post he held until 1918. He was also appointed to the Dardanelles Commission. Cawley was created a Baronet, of Prestwich in the County Palatine of Lancaster, in 1906, and was raised to the peerage as Baron Cawley, of Prestwich in the County Palatine of Lancaster, in 1918. He was also a Justice of the Peace for Herefordshire.

Family
Lord Cawley married Elizabeth Smith, daughter of John Smith and Fanny Robson, in 1876. They had four sons, of whom the three youngest, Harold Cawley MP, John and Oswald Cawley MP, were killed in the First World War, and one daughter, Hilda Cawley. In memory of his three dead sons, Cawley endowed a ward at Ancoats Hospital, Manchester, in 1919 at a cost of £10,000.

In 1901 Cawley acquired the estate of Berrington Hall near Leominster in Herefordshire, which had previously been in the hands of the Rodney family. This was the family seat until 1957, when it was handed over to the government in lieu of death duties, and it is now in the care of the National Trust. Lady Cawley died in March 1930. Lord Cawley died at Berrington Hall in March, 1937, aged 86, and was succeeded in the baronetcy and barony by his eldest and only surviving son, Robert.

Arms

References

External links

1850 births
1937 deaths
English justices of the peace
Barons in the Peerage of the United Kingdom
Frederick
Liberal Party (UK) MPs for English constituencies
UK MPs 1895–1900
UK MPs 1900–1906
UK MPs 1906–1910
UK MPs 1910
UK MPs 1910–1918
UK MPs who were granted peerages
People educated at Wesley College, Sheffield
Members of the Privy Council of the United Kingdom
Barons created by George V
Chancellors of the Duchy of Lancaster